Seh Deran (also Romanized as Seh Derān and Seh Darān; also known as Sedran) is a village in Sarduiyeh Rural District, Sarduiyeh District, Jiroft County, Kerman Province, Iran. At the 2006 census, its population was 425, in 63 families.

References 

Populated places in Jiroft County